Schleid is a municipality in the Wartburgkreis district of Thuringia, Germany.

References

Rhön Mountains
Wartburgkreis
Grand Duchy of Saxe-Weimar-Eisenach